The 2007 Indiana Fever season was their 8th season in the Women's National Basketball Association (WNBA). They finished 2nd in the Eastern Conference with 21 wins and 13 losses on the season. The season marked the third consecutive season that the Fever earned a playoff berth. They eliminated the Connecticut Sun, 2–1, in the First Round of the playoffs but then in turn were eliminated in the Eastern Conference Finals, 2–1, by the Detroit Shock.

Offseason
On March 23, 2007 the Fever signed Tammy Sutton-Brown from the defunct Charlotte Sting, Sutton-Brown was one of the most sought-after free agents.

The following player was selected in the Dispersal Draft from the Charlotte Sting: 
Sheri Sam

2007 WNBA Draft

Indiana's selections from the 2008 WNBA Draft in Cleveland.

Roster

Depth

Season standings

Schedule

Preseason

Regular season

Playoffs

First round

Eastern Conference Finals

Awards and records

Awards
Kim Perrot Sportsmanship Award: Tully Bevilaqua

Records

Player stats

Season

Playoffs

Transactions
February 14, 2007 re-signed Tully Bevilaqua.
March 7, 2007 traded Olympia Scott to the Phoenix Mercury for Ann Strother.
March 14, 2007 exercised the 2008 option on Tan White's contract.
March 23, 2007 traded La'Tangela Atkinson to the Sacramento Monarchs for the 24th pick in the 2008 WNBA Draft
March 23, 2007 re-signed Anna DeForge and signed free agent Tammy Sutton-Brown.
April 13, 2007 waived Linda Frohlich.
April 13, 2007 traded the 40th pick in the 2008 WNBA Draft for Jessica Dickson.
May 7, 2007 waived Lyndsey Medders.
May 9, 2007 waived Erin Lawless and Ashley Key.
May 16, 2007 waived Jessica Dickson and Jennifer Humphrey.

References

External links
Official Indiana Fever website
Official WNBA website

Indiana Fever
Indiana Fever seasons
Indiana